R-407C is a mixture of hydrofluorocarbons used as a refrigerant.It is a zeotropic blend of difluoromethane (R-32), pentafluoroethane (R-125), and 1,1,1,2-tetrafluoroethane (R-134a). Difluoromethane serves to provide the heat capacity, pentafluoroethane decreases flammability, tetrafluoroethane reduces pressure.  R-407C cylinders are colored burnt orange.

This refrigerant is intended as a replacement for R-22. R-22 production will be phased out by 2020 as per the Montreal Protocol.

Physical properties

References

Refrigerants
Greenhouse gases